Cellarr (fomerly know as Maybe Rave and OpenSide) is a band from Auckland, New Zealand, formed in 2012 by Jen Newton, PJ Shepherd, Harry Carter and George Powell. The original singer, Jen Newton, left the band in 2014 and was replaced by Possum Plows. Plows later left the band in 2020. Openside was originally known as Maybe Rave; however, they later changed their name to Openside, inspired by the sport Quidditch where one of the positions is Openside Chaser. In 2016, the band released their debut EP Album "Push Back" which reached number twelve in the New Zealand Charts and number two in the New Zealand Music Charts. In 2020, the band broke up and the males from the band created their new band called "Cellarr".

As Maybe Rave, 2012–2014
Before being signed, Maybe Rave started in 2012 and launched themselves in 2013. In 2013, they did covers from artists including Lorde while also releasing original music. They released a song called "Here Me Now"  and an EP "At Peace In Pieces". In 2014, Jen Newton left the band and Possum Plows became the lead singer. Maybe Rave released a new song called "First Time" with Possum Plows as lead vocals. After releasing the song they toured in Australia, doing shows in Sydney, Melbourne, and Gold Coast. In March 2015, the band announced that they had changed their name to Openside.

As Openside 2015 - 2020

Push Back, 2015–2017 
They signed with a new management company called CRS Management, who also manage New Zealand artists like Brooke Fraser, The Naked and Famous, and Maala. In March 2016, the band signed with the record company Warner Music NZ. Later that year, Openside would release their debut EP, Push Back. Push Back would peak at #2 in the New Zealand Music Albums charts and #12 in the New Zealand Album charts. A single from Push Back, "Letting it Out", also reached #2 on the New Zealand music Heatseeker Charts. In September 2016, they were chosen to open for Ellie Goulding, All Time Low, Ladyhawke, Fall Out Boy, Twenty One Pilots and Panic! at the Disco. In August 2017, the band released their single "I Feel Nothing". The single had some local success reaching 11th in the New Zealand Music Charts. After releasing the single, Possum Plows wrote an article with Spin Off about coming out as gender-nonbinary. In April 2018, Openside released the single "No Going Back", which peaked at #1 in the New Zealand Hot Single Charts. With the success of the single, they toured New Zealand, playing shows in Christchurch, Hamilton, Wellington and Palmerston North.

Character Flaws, Waiting for love, Break up, Paul McKessar Sex Scandall 2018–2021 
In early October 2018, Openside released the single "Character Flaws" which peaked at #2 in the New Zealand Music Hot Single Charts and #23 in the New Zealand Hot Single Charts. The band later announced that they will be releasing a comic book at the 2018 Auckland Armageddon. In the first week of their single "Episode One: Character Flaws" being released, "Character Flaws" re-entered the NZ Music Hot Charts back at number 2, with their song "Work Out" entering the same charts at 8th and "Tuesday" entering at 19th. On 31 December 2018, the band performed on the third day of Rhythm & Vines. In February 2019, the vocalist Possum Plows was verbally abused by a homophobic man at a Countdown Supermarket in Ponsonby. The abuse came after Possum was kissing their girlfriend in public. Possum stated that they feel less safe in public spaces. That same month, the band performed at Big Gay Out for the second time. At Big Gay Out, the band performed their new song "Waiting for Love", which was later released as a single on in March 2019. Openside performed their first headline show for 2019 on 6 April at Avondale Hollywood Cinema in Auckland. On 16 January 2020, Openside announced their breakup via their Facebook page. In 2021, Possum Plows admitted to having a sexual relationship, as well as a business relationship with the bands manager Paul McKessar. Possum ended the sexual relationship after four years. The business relationship ended soon after the sexual relationship and Openside broke up shortly afterward. Possum did not solely blame Paul McKessar for the reason why Openside broke up. Possum described the relationship as steep power imbalance.

As Cellarr 2021 - Present 
In May 2021, the male members of the band came back together to form a new band under the name of Cellarr. They released their first single under their new name called "LUV. In September 2022, the band released their first EP since being called Cellarr, called "Better". In February 2023, they released their second EP called Golden Minds Resort.

Band members

Current members
 PJ Shepherd – Guitar (2012–present)
 George Powell – drums (2012–present)
 Harry Carter – Bass (2012–present)
Former members
 Jen Newton – Lead vocals (2012–2014)
 Possum Plows – Lead vocals (2014–2020)

Timeline

Discography

As OpenSide

Extended plays

Singles

Other charted songs

Music videos

As Cellarr

Extended plays

Singles

Music videos

Concert tours

As Maybe Rave 
Headlining
 Maybe Rave at the Ellen Melville Hall (2013) 
 MAYBE RAVE Australian Tour (2014)
Opening Act
 All Time Low (2013) 
 Hurricane Kids (2013) 
 Neck Deep (2014) 
 Swifts and Sparrows (2014)
 Marianas Trench (2014)

As Openside 
Headlining
 Openside Lot23 (2017)
 No Going Back Tour (2018)
 Openside - Live at Hollywood Avondale (2019)
 Openside NZ Tour (2019)
Opening Act
 Blurryface Tour  (2015)
 Ladyhawke (2016)
 Delirium World Tour  (2016)
 All Time Low (2017)
 Mania Tour  (2018)
 Pray for the Wicked Tour  (2018)
 Anne-Marie (2019)
Festivals
 Auckland Council Music in Parks: PleasePlease (2016)
 Auckland City Limits Music Festival (2016)
 Silent Sound (2016)
 Going Global (2016)
 Rainbow's End Night Frights (2016)
 Seamless (2016 - 2018)
 Big Gay Out (2017)
 Edgefest (2017)
 Jim Beam Homegrown Music Festival (2017)
 Armageddon (2018)
 Rhythm & Vines (2018)
 Big Gay Out (2019)

As Cellarr 
Headlining
 CELLARR + FRIENDS: LIVE AT WHAMMY! (2022)

Bibliography
Comics
 Openside Episode One: Character Flaws (art by Inzunza, written by William Geradts & Possum Plows, Ink by Danny Jimenz, Lettering by Christian Docolomansky, Warner Music New Zealand, 2018)

References

Pop punk musicians
LGBT-themed musical groups
New Zealand punk rock groups
New Zealand LGBT musicians
Non-binary musicians
People with non-binary gender identities
Transgender musicians